Erebus candidii is a moth of the family Erebidae. It is found in Taiwan.

References

Moths described in 1920
Erebus (moth)